Jan Munk Michaelsen (born 28 November 1970) is a former Danish footballer and currently is the head of coaching at Nykøbing FC. He made 20 international appearances, scored one goal for the Danish national team. He is the son of former Danish footballer, the late Allan Michaelsen.

Career
Starting his career in small Danish clubs, his first major club was AB, where he played 170 matches. He moved on to the Greek club Panathinaikos, for whom he played 100 matches, including numerous appearances in the Champions League. In July 2004, after winning The Double in Greece, he moved to HamKam.

From January 2009, Michaelsen was the head coach for F.C. Copenhagen's 2. Division team. In the 2009–10 season, he was the head coach of F.C. Copenhagen's U17-team. He succeeded Thomas Frank as head coach of the Denmark under-17 national team in 2012.

In March 2019, Michaelsen became assistant manager of Vendsyssel FF. He left the job at the end of June 2019 to become head of coaching at Nykøbing FC.

Honours
Panathinaikos
Alpha Ethniki: 2003–04
Greek Football Cup: 2003–04

References

External links
Danish national team profile 

Danish men's footballers
Denmark international footballers
1970 births
Living people
Akademisk Boldklub players
Panathinaikos F.C. players
Hamarkameratene players
2002 FIFA World Cup players
Expatriate footballers in Greece
Expatriate footballers in Norway
Super League Greece players
Eliteserien players
Danish expatriate men's footballers
Vanløse IF players
Association football midfielders
Danish expatriate sportspeople in Greece
Fremad Amager managers
Danish football managers
Danish 1st Division managers